Eilema marginata is a moth of the subfamily Arctiinae. It was described by Félix Édouard Guérin-Méneville in 1844. It is found on Madagascar.

References

marginata
Moths described in 1844